Micrantheum hexandrum, commonly known as box micrantheum, is a shrub in the family Picrodendraceae.

References

Picrodendraceae
Malpighiales of Australia
Flora of New South Wales
Flora of Queensland
Flora of Victoria (Australia)
Flora of Tasmania